The 33rd King's Cup finals was held from 10 to 16 February 2002 at the  Supachalasai Stadium  in Bangkok, Thailand. The King's Cup (คิงส์คัพ) is an annual football tournament; the first tournament was played in 1968.

Participating nations

Venue
All matches held at the  Supachalasai Stadium  in Bangkok, Thailand

Tournament

Round robin tournament

Matches

Place Match

Final

Winner

Scorers
2 goals
  Mohd Faduhasny
  Pitipong Kuldilok

1 goals

  Choe Ung-chon
  Kim Yong-jun
  Kim Yong-soon
  Lee Oun-choy
  Ri Kum-chol
  Assin Nasser
  Hussein Yasser
  Mohammed Yasser
  Mustafa Jalal Mousa
  Sayed Ali Bechir
  Anurak Srikerd
  Kwanchai Seungprakob
  Sakda Joemdee

External links
 King's Cup results RSSSF

King's Cup
International association football competitions hosted by Thailand
Cup